The 2012 NCAA Division I women's soccer tournament (also known as the 2012 Women's College Cup) was the 31st annual single-elimination tournament to determine the national champion of NCAA Division I women's collegiate soccer. The semifinals and championship game were played at Torero Stadium in San Diego, California from November 30–December 2, 2012 while the preceding rounds were played at various sites across the country from November 9–23.

North Carolina defeated Penn State in the final, 4–1, to win their twenty-first national title. The Tar Heels (15–5–3) were coached by Anson Dorrance.

The most outstanding offensive player was Kealia Ohai from North Carolina, and the most outstanding defensive player was Satara Murray, also from North Carolina. Murray and Ohai, alongside nine other players, were named to the All-Tournament team.

The tournament's leading scorer, with 7 goals and 1 assist, was Tiffany McCarty from Florida State.

Qualification

All Division I women's soccer programs were eligible to qualify for the tournament. The tournament field remained fixed at 64 teams.

Format
Just as before, the final two rounds, deemed the Women's College Cup, were played at a pre-determined neutral site. All other rounds were played on campus sites at the home field of the higher-seeded team although with a few exceptions. The first round was played exclusively on the home fields of higher-seeded teams (noted with an asterisk below). However, the second and third rounds were played on the home fields of the home fields of the two remaining teams in each bracket with the highest seed (generally the #1 and #2 seed in each bracket with a few noted exceptions). Those teams are also noted with asterisk. Finally, the quarterfinal round, or the championship match for each bracket, was played on the home field of the higher-seeded team, with no exceptions.

National seeds

Teams

Bracket

Stanford Bracket

BYU Bracket

Penn State Bracket

Florida State Bracket

College Cup

All-tournament team
Kealia Ohai, North Carolina (most outstanding offensive player)
Satara Murray, North Carolina (most outstanding defensive player)
Amber Brooks, North Carolina
Crystal Dunn, North Carolina
Adelaide Gay, North Carolina
Maddy Evans, Penn State
Maya Hayes, Penn State
Christine Nairn, Penn State
Taylor Schram, Penn State
Emily Oliver, Stanford
Tiffany McCarty, Florida State

Attendances

See also 
 NCAA Women's Soccer Championships (Division II, Division III)
 NCAA Men's Soccer Championships (Division I, Division II, Division III)

References

NCAA
NCAA Women's Soccer Championship
NCAA Division I Women's Soccer Tournament
NCAA Division I Women's Soccer Tournament
NCAA Division I Women's Soccer Tournament